Problepsis aegretta is a moth of the  family Geometridae. It is found in Kenya, South Africa and Uganda.

Subspecies
Problepsis aegretta aegretta (South Africa)
Problepsis aegretta insculpta Prout, 1917 (Kenya, Uganda)

References

Moths described in 1875
Scopulini
Moths of Africa